Griff Furst (born September 17, 1981, in Van Nuys, California) is an American actor, film producer, and film director.

Furst has appeared in over a hundred television and film productions. In 2011 a Variety article singled him out with Antoni Corone as "[an actor] who can make a big impression with only a few scenes".

He is vice-president of Curmudgeon Films, founded with his father, Stephen Furst, which has produced films including Cold Moon, Nightmare Shark, You Might Be the Killer, Sinfidelity, Black Market Baby, and the forthcoming 57 Seconds. He also co-wrote and directed Cold Moon and the 2011 film Mask Maker.

Selected filmography 
 2000 Stageghost as Rob
 2004 Boa vs. Python

 2007 Take as Young Mechanic

 2008 Living Proof as Charlie Wilson
 2009 I Love You Phillip Morris as Mark
 2009 Tribute (TV Movie) as Brian Morrow
 2010 Movin' In
 2011 Green Lantern as UCAV Operator 1
 2012 Transit as Lieutenant B. Morgan

 2015 Focus as Gareth

 2015 Terminator Genisys as Agent Burke

 2016 The Founder as Jim Zien
 2018 Steel Country as Max Himmler
 2019 Dead Water as David Cooper
 2022 A Tale of Two Guns''

References

External links

 

American male film actors
American male television actors
American television directors
Living people
1981 births
21st-century American male actors
Horror film directors